American Art Review is an art magazine founded and edited by Thomas R. Kellaway who published the magazine from September 1973 until November 1978.  In the summer of 1992 he revived the magazine, which is published to this day. It is published on a bimonthly basis and was headquartered in Shawnee Mission, Kansas. The magazine is based in Stratham, New Hampshire.

American Art Review concentrates on American art from the colonial era until the early 1970s.  It focuses especially on exhibitions of figurative art in regional museums. The content is generally divided between scholarly articles on artists and advertisements from galleries.

References

External links 
Official site
Brief biography of Kellaway, which mentions the magazine.

Art history journals
Bimonthly magazines published in the United States
Magazines established in 1973
Magazines published in New Hampshire
Magazines published in Kansas
Visual arts magazines published in the United States